George Marian Pirtea (born 24 July 1996) is a Romanian professional footballer who plays as a midfielder for Liga IV side ACS Socodor.

References

External links

1996 births
Living people
Romanian footballers
Association football midfielders
CF Liberty Oradea players
CS Gloria Arad players
CS Șoimii Pâncota players
CS Pandurii Târgu Jiu players
CS Național Sebiș players
Liga II players
CS Mioveni players
Liga I players
People from Chișineu-Criș